Rubus ictus is a North American species of dewberry in section Verotriviales of the genus Rubus, a member of the rose family. It is native to the southeastern United States, in the States of Mississippi, Alabama, Florida, and Georgia, in addition to Arkansas.

References

ictus
Plants described in 1925
Flora of the Southeastern United States
Flora without expected TNC conservation status